The 2000 Mercedes Cup was a men's tennis tournament played on outdoor clay courts at the Tennis Club Weissenhof in Stuttgart, Germany that was part of the International Series Gold of the 2000 ATP Tour. It was the 52nd edition of the tournament and was held from 17 July until 23 July 2000. Fifth-seeded Franco Squillari won the singles title.

Finals

Singles

 Franco Squillari defeated  Gastón Gaudio 6–2, 3–6, 4–6, 6–4, 6–2
 It was Squillari's 2nd singles title of the year and the 3rd of his career.

Doubles

 Jiří Novák /  David Rikl defeated  Lucas Arnold Ker /  Donald Johnson 5–7, 6–2, 6–3
 It was Novák's 3rd title of the year and the 12th of his career. It was Rikl's 3rd title of the year and the 18th of his career.

References

External links
 Official website 
 ITF tournament edition details
 ATP tournament profile

Stuttgart Open
Stuttgart Open
2000 in German tennis